Adékọ́lá is a Yoruba name and surname meaning "the crown or royalty gathers success and wealth". Outside of Nigeria, it is also prevalent in the UK and the US.

Notable people with this name include:
 Adekola Ogunoye II, Nigerian ruler
 Adewale Oke Adekola (1932–1999), Nigerian engineer
 David Adekola (born 1968), Nigerian footballer
 Odunlade Adekola (born 1978), Nigerian actor
 Ooni Adekola, Nigerian ruler

References